The canton of Delle is an administrative division of the Territoire de Belfort department, northeastern France. Its borders were modified at the French canton reorganisation which came into effect in March 2015. Its seat is in Delle.

It consists of the following communes:

Beaucourt 
Courcelles
Courtelevant
Croix
Delle
Faverois
Fêche-l'Église
Florimont
Joncherey
Lebetain
Lepuix-Neuf
Montbouton
Réchésy
Saint-Dizier-l'Évêque
Thiancourt
Villars-le-Sec

References

Cantons of the Territoire de Belfort